Boot Pond is a  pond in Plymouth, Massachusetts within the Eel River watershed. The pond is located west of South Pond village, northwest of Gunners Exchange Pond and Hoyts Pond, and north of Myles Standish State Forest. The pond is a secondary municipal water supply for the Town of Plymouth.

Boot Pond was so named on account of its boot-shaped outline.

References

External links
Environmental Protection Agency
South Shore Coastal Watersheds - Lake Assessments

Ponds of Plymouth, Massachusetts
Ponds of Massachusetts